Mīlgrāvis is a neighbourhood of Northern District in Riga, the capital of Latvia. It is located on the western shore of Lake Ķīšezers.

External links
 

Neighbourhoods in Riga